Michael Black (1928 – 14 February 2019) was a British sculptor who lived and worked in Oxford. He is best known for carving the Emperors' Heads outside the Sheldonian Theatre in Oxford.

Biography 
Michael Black was born in Portsmouth in 1928. His father was a vicar. After National Service Black moved to Oxford and studied at St Catherine's College, a constituent college of the University of Oxford. 

Whilst a student, Black began working as a sculptor's assistant, before securing his own commissions. 

In 1970, Black was commissioned to create 17 replacements for the Emperor's Heads outside the Sheldonian Theatre in Oxford. The original heads had been carved in Clipsham stone,  by William Byrd between 1664 and 1669, before being replaced in 1868. The newer statues eroded faster than the older statues and thus needed to be replaced sooner. Black carved the replacement statues in his studio at Folly Bridge and then at Medley Manor Farm, Binsey, Oxford.

The statues were replaced by Black's new heads in 1972. The family later donated one of the original 17th-century heads to Wadham College; it is located in the gardens of the college.

Personal life and death 
Michael Black was married to the Oxford painter Jacqueline Black (1933–2000), with whom he had four children. Black died on 14 February 2019 aged 90.

References

Sources 

 

Artists from Oxford
English sculptors
1928 births
2019 deaths
Alumni of St Catherine's College, Oxford